The 2011 Scottish Professional Championship was a professional non-ranking snooker tournament that took place between 11 and 14 April at the Lucky Break Snooker Club in Clydebank, Scotland. The tournament was last held in 1989, where John Rea defeated Murdo MacLeod 9–7 in the final.

John Higgins won in the final 6–1 against Anthony McGill. 


Main draw

Final

Qualifying

References 

2011
2011 in snooker
2011 in Scottish sport
Sport in West Dunbartonshire